Events during the year 1934 in  Northern Ireland.

Incumbents
 Governor - 	The Duke of Abercorn 
 Prime Minister - James Craig

Events
20 January – The funeral of the veteran nationalist Member of Parliament, Joseph Devlin, takes place in Belfast.
27 January – Presentation of Belfast Castle to the City of Belfast by the Earl of Shaftesbury is announced. 
28 March – Belfast Zoo opens in part of Bellevue Pleasure Gardens. 
24 April – In a debate in the Parliament of Northern Ireland, the Prime Minister, Lord Craigavon, states "All I boast of is that we are a Protestant Parliament and a Protestant State." (often misquoted as "A Protestant Parliament for a Protestant People").
29 May – King's Hall, Belfast, the largest exhibition venue in Northern Ireland, is opened.

Arts and literature

Sport

Football
Irish League
Winners: Linfield

Irish Cup
Winners: Linfield 4 - 0 Cliftonville

Ballymena Football Club is renamed Ballymena United F.C.

Births
20 January – Josias Cunningham, stock broker, farmer and politician (died 2000).
3 March – Peter Brooke, 9th Secretary of State for Northern Ireland.
8 April – Wilson Clyde, former Democratic Unionist Party politician.
14 May – Francis Fee, cricketer.
23 May – Syd Millar, former international rugby player and chairman of the International Rugby Board.
28 June – Robert Carswell, Baron Carswell, barrister and judge.
4 July – James Hamilton, 5th Duke of Abercorn, soldier, politician and peer.
18 August – Ronnie Carroll, singer and entertainer (died 2015).
14 November – Catherine McGuinness, President of the Law Reform Commission and former justice of the Supreme Court of Ireland.

Full date unknown
Eileen Paisley, Baroness Paisley of St George's, Democratic Unionist Party politician and life peer.

Deaths
18 January – Joseph Devlin, Nationalist politician and MP in the British House of Commons and in Northern Ireland (born 1872).
April - Robert McCall, lawyer (born 1849).

See also
1934 in Scotland
1934 in Wales

References